Sham Rock are a British pseudo-folk band from Belfast, Northern Ireland, known solely for their 1998 single, "Tell Me Ma" (a pop version of 19th century children's song "I'll Tell Me Ma"). "Tell Me Ma" peaked at number 13 on the UK Singles Chart and remained on the charts for 13 weeks. It sold over 200,000 copies in the United Kingdom and Ireland.

A one-hit wonder, Sham Rock had no other chart entries.

Discography
Sham Rock: The Album (2003)

References

British pop music groups
British folk music groups
British dance music groups